The  Philadelphia Eagles season was the franchise's 46th season in the National Football League (NFL). The Eagles reached the postseason for the first time since their championship-winning season in 1960, which ended the longest postseason drought in the franchise's history and one of the longest in the history of the NFL. The Eagles ended their playoff drought by winning their final game in the regular season and needing either the Minnesota Vikings or Green Bay Packers to lose - both teams ended up losing and thus earned a wild card entry. This was also the first season since 1966 in which the franchise finished the season with a winning record.

The Miracle at the Meadowlands 

The Miracle at the Meadowlands is the term used by sportscasters and Philadelphia Eagles fans for a fumble recovery by cornerback Herman Edwards that he returned for a touchdown at the end of a November 19, 1978 NFL game against the New York Giants in Giants Stadium.

It was seen as miraculous because it occurred at a point in the game when the Giants were easily capable of running out the game's final seconds. The Giants had the ball, and the Eagles had no timeouts left. Everyone watching expected quarterback Joe Pisarcik to take one more snap and kneel with the ball, thus running out the clock and preserving a 17–12 Giant upset. Instead, he attempted to hand it off to fullback Larry Csonka and botched it, allowing Edwards to pick up the ball and run 26 yards for the winning score.

The Eagles were 6–5 going into this game, and the win was crucial in that it ultimately allowed the Eagles to get the fifth-and-final playoff spot in the 1978 NFC playoffs.

Off Season 
The Eagles held their last training camp at Widener University in the city of Chester, in Delaware County, Pennsylvania)

NFL Draft 
The 1978 NFL Draft The draft was held May 3-4, 1978. The league also held a supplemental draft after the regular draft and before the regular season. The draft was 12 rounds long with a total of 334 players selected.

The Eagles, because of previous trades made, had to wait until the 3rd round for their first pick. They would only have 7 picks and of these 7 players selected, 5 made the team and played during the season. With the 66th pick the Eagles as their first pick in the draft the Philadelphia Eagles selected Reggie Wilkes, a linebacker out of Georgia Tech.

The number 1 overall pick in the draft was taken by the Houston Oilers who selected the 1977 Heisman Trophy winner, Earl Campbell a running back out of the University of Texas

Future Pro Football Hall of Fame inductee, in 2006, Warren Moon, a quarterback from the University of Washington, went undrafted. Moon is also in the Canadian Football League’s Hall of Fame.

Player selections 
The table shows the Eagles selections and what picks they had that were traded away and the team that ended up with that pick. It is possible the Eagles' pick ended up with this team via another team that the Eagles made a trade with.
Not shown are acquired picks that the Eagles traded away.

Preseason 
 On August 5, the NFL played its first game in Mexico City. The New Orleans Saints defeated the Eagles by a score of 14–7.

Regular season

Schedule 

Note: Intra-division opponents are in bold text.

Game recap

Week 1 vs LA Rams

Week 3 at NO Saints 
Television: CBS
Announcers: Gary Bender and Hank Stram
Former Youngstown State University star Ron Jaworski threw three touchdown passes two to Harold Carmichael one from 6 yards and the other from 18 yards as the Eagles got their first win of the season. The bitterness stemmed from the fact that one of their teammates, kick return specialist Wally Henry, suffered a broken leg when he hit illegally from behind. Henry was playing on the kickoff team in the third quarter when he was hit and carried from the field. Only minutes earlier, he had set up a touchdown with a 55-yard punt return to the Saints 20-yard line. The Eagles also had a 20-yard touchdown pass from Jaworski to Keith Krepfle and a Nick Mike-Mayer 21-yard field goal. The Saints also scored with a 47-yard pass from Archie Manning to Tinker Owens Touchdown connection, a nine-yard score from fullback Tony Galbreath and a 21-yard field goal by Rich Szaro. The Eagles had to make two last minute interceptions to halt the Saints drive to a tying score.

Week 5 at Baltimore Colts 
Television: CBS
Announcers: Tim Ryan, Tom Matte and Roman Gabriel
Colts quarterback Bill Troup moved Baltimore 71 yards in nine plays for the first touchdown, on a two-yard run by Roosevelt Leaks, the drive started after Nick Mike Mayer missed a 46-yard field goal. Two plays later the Colts have the ball again when Philadelphia quarterback Ron Jaworski fumbled and defensive end John Dutton recovered at the Eagles 38. Pass interference on a razzle-dazzle play in which running back Joe Washington took a handoff and pitches back to Troup who then threw a pass to Roger Carr, put the ball on the Eagles 1 yard line but couldn't score. They quickly got another chance when Wilbert Montgomery fumbled and Derrell Luce recovered the ball and carried it to the 4 where Troup threw to Leaks for a 14-0 Colts lead. But the Eagles came back roaring in the 4th quarter when Jaworski threw a 20-yard pass to Krepfle and then Mayer kick a 26-yard chip shot and then Montgomery who rushed for 144 yards on the day scored a 14-yard touchdown run with 2:39 left in the game to secure a must win for the Eagles who now trail the Redskins by 2 games (5-0) in the NFC East standings.

Week 9 vs St. Louis Cardinals 
The St. Louis Cardinals come into the game with a win–loss record of 0–8 against the 4th place, 4 wins and 4 losses Philadelphia Eagles.

Week 11 vs NY Jets

Week 12 

The Miracle at the Meadowlands is the term used by sportscasters and Philadelphia Eagles fans for a fumble recovery by cornerback Herman Edwards that he returned for a touchdown at the end of a November 19, 1978 NFL game against the New York Giants in Giants Stadium. It was seen as miraculous because it occurred at a point in the game when the Giants were easily capable of running out the game's final seconds. The Giants had the ball, and the Eagles had no timeouts left. Everyone watching expected quarterback Joe Pisarcik to take one more snap and kneel with the ball, thus running out the clock and preserving a 17–12 Giant upset. Instead, he attempted to hand it off to fullback Larry Csonka and botched it, allowing Edwards to pick up the ball and run 26 yards for the winning score.

Week 13 at St. Louis Cardinals 
After the games of week 11 the Philadelphia Eagles' outlook of being an NFC playoff team was slim. They were in 3rd place in the NFC East and behind 4 teams for a Wild Card team spot. That was some of the reasoning why the placekicking duties were given to the punter Mike Michel when regular kicker Nick Mick-Meyer got hurt. At the end of week 13 the Eagles found themselves trailing division leading Dallas by one game, and tied with the Atlanta Falcons and Washington Redskins for 1 of 2 Wild Card team playoff spots.

Standings 
The Eagles were hampered by the loss of their placekicker (Nick Mike-Mayer) in the closing weeks of the season and his replacement (punter Mike Michel) missed an extra point kick in each of the last three games of the season.

Roster

Postseason

NFL Wild Card Game 

The Falcons won their first playoff game in team history after they overcame a 13–0 deficit by scoring 2 touchdowns in the final 5 minutes of the game. Punter Mike Michel, who took over placekicker duties when regular placekicker Nick Mike-Mayer got injured in week 12, missed a possible game-winning 34-yard field goal in the closing seconds.

Awards and honors 
 UPI Coach of the Year: Dick Vermeil

League Leaders
 Harold Carmichael, NFC Leader, Receiving Yards – 1072 
 Wilbert Montgomery, NFC Leader, Rushing Avg – 4.6

References

External links 
 Eagles on Pro Football Reference
 Eagles on jt-sw.com
 Eagles on Eagles.net

Philadelphia Eagles seasons
Philadelphia Eagles
Philadel